Thomas Gholson may refer to:

 Thomas Gholson Jr. (died 1816), American lawyer and politician in Virginia
 Thomas Saunders Gholson (1808–1868), Virginia lawyer, judge and Confederate politician